The Somatotropin family is a protein family whose titular representative is somatotropin, also known as growth hormone, a hormone that plays an important role in growth control. Other members include choriomammotropin (lactogen), its placental analogue; prolactin, which promotes lactation in the mammary gland, and placental prolactin-related proteins; proliferin and proliferin related protein; and somatolactin from various fishes. The 3D structure of bovine somatotropin has been predicted using a combination of heuristics and energy minimisation.

Human peptides from this family 
CSH1;      CSH2;      CSHL1;     GH1;       GH2 (hGH-V);       PRL;

References

Protein domains
Hormones of the somatotropic axis